Alexander Smith Laidlaw (13 August 1877 – 12 September 1933) was a Scottish dual-code international rugby union and professional rugby league footballer.

Background
Alex Laidlaw was born in Edinburgh, Scotland, he was the landlord of The Prospect Hotel public house, 527 Bolton Road, Bradford, and he died aged 56 in Bradford, West Riding of Yorkshire, England.

Rugby Union career

Amateur career

Laidlaw played rugby union for Hawick.

Provincial career

He was capped by South of Scotland District in their match against North of Scotland District on 11 December 1897.

International career

He earned one cap for Scotland in a victory over Ireland during the 1897 Home Nations Championship.

Rugby League career

Laidlaw later played rugby league for Bradford F.C. (now Bradford Park Avenue A.F.C.), signing in 1898, and representative level rugby league (RL) for Other Nationalities, as a forward (prior to the specialist positions of), during the era of contested scrums.

Championship final appearances

Alex Laidlaw played as a forward, i.e. number 9, in Bradford FC's 5–0 victory over Salford in the Championship tiebreaker during the 1903–04 season at Thrum Hall, Hanson Lane, Halifax on Thursday 28 April 1904, in front of a crowd of 12,000.

Challenge Cup Final appearances

Alex Laidlaw played as a forward, i.e. number 9, and scored a try in Bradford F.C.'s 5–0 victory over Salford in the 1906 Challenge Cup Final during the 1905–06 season at Headingley Rugby Stadium, Leeds, on Saturday 28 April 1906, in front of a crowd of 15,834.

References

External links
[http://www.rlhp.co.uk/imagedetail.asp?id=1432 Image 
[http://www.rlhp.co.uk/imagedetail.asp?id=1433 Image 
[http://www.rlhp.co.uk/imagedetail.asp?id=1431 Image 

1877 births
1933 deaths
Bradford F.C. players
Dual-code rugby internationals
Hawick RFC players
Other Nationalities rugby league team players
Publicans
Rugby league forwards
Rugby league players from Edinburgh
Rugby union forwards
Rugby union players from Edinburgh
Scotland international rugby union players
Scottish rugby league players
Scottish rugby union players
South of Scotland District (rugby union) players